Milton Green may refer to:

 Milton Green (1913–2005), an American Jewish sportsperson
 Milton Green, Cheshire, a hamlet in Cheshire, England
 Milton Green, Devon, a hamlet in Devon, England

See also
 Milton Greene